Pope Celestine IV (c. 1180/1187 − 10 November 1241), born Goffredo da Castiglione, was head of the Catholic Church and ruler of the Papal States for only a few days from 25 October 1241 to his death in 10 November 1241.

History 
Born in Milan, Goffredo or Godfrey is often referred to as son of a sister of Pope Urban III, but this claim is without foundation. Nothing is known of his early life until he became chancellor of the church of Milan (perhaps as early as 1219, certainly in 1223–27). Pope Gregory IX made him a cardinal on 18 September 1227 with the diocese and benefice of San Marco, and in 1228–29 sent him as legate in Lombardy and Tuscany, where the cities and communes had generally remained true to the Hohenstaufen emperor, Frederick II. He was dispatched in an attempt to bring these territories around to the papal side, but without success.  In 1238, he was made cardinal bishop of Sabina.

The papal election of 1241, which elevated Celestine to the papal throne, was held under stringent conditions that hastened his death. The papal curia was disunited over the violent struggle to bring the Emperor and King of Sicily Frederick II to heel. One group of cardinals favored the ambitious schemes of the Gregorian Reform and aimed to humble Frederick as a papal vassal. Frederick, however, controlled as his unwilling guests in Tivoli two cardinals whom he had captured at sea, and in Rome Cardinal Giovanni Colonna was his ally, largely because the curia was in the hands of the archenemy of the Colonna family, the senator Matteo Rosso Orsini. The latter held the consistory captive under the control of his guards in the ramshackle palace of the Septizodium, where rain leaked through the roof of their chamber, mingled with the urine of Orsini's guards on the rooftiles. One of the cardinals, the Englishman Robert of Somercotes, fell ill and died.

One group of cardinals, which included Sinibaldo de' Fieschi (soon to be Pope Innocent IV) supported a candidate from the inner circle of Pope Gregory IX, who could be expected to pursue a hard line with Frederick II. Another group advocated a moderate middle course, not as allies of the Hohenstaufen, but desirous to achieve an end to the war in Italy. Overtures to Frederick II, however, were met with the impossible demand that if they wished the cardinals in his hands to return to Rome, they must elect as pope Otto of St. Nicholas, an amenable compromise figure. Matteo Rosso Orsini's candidate, Romano da Porto, who had persecuted scholars at the University of Paris, was considered unacceptable.

Only on 25 October 1241 was the cardinal bishop of Sabina finally elected by the required two-thirds majority, seven cardinals out of ten. He took the name Pope Celestine IV but occupied the throne for only seventeen days. It is said that this was nevertheless long enough for him to proceed, as his only   significant act, with the  excommunication of Matteo Rosso Orsini.  This assertion is disputed, it being said that in fact, Orsini continued as Senator of Rome in 1242 and was Senator when Innocent IV (Fieschi) was elected; and that his son (the future Nicholas III) was made a cardinal in 1244. In any event, Celestine IV died before he could be crowned, on 10 November 1241, of fatigue and old  age, and was entombed in St Peter's.

See also

List of popes

Notes

Sources
 
 
 Lexikon der Mittelalters, vol. iii, part 7 (On-line).
   A standard account.

External links

Popes
Italian popes
Cardinal-bishops of Sabina
Diplomats of the Holy See
13th-century Italian Roman Catholic bishops
Clergy from Milan
Celestine IV
Cardinal-nephews
Year of birth unknown
13th-century popes
Burials at St. Peter's Basilica